The following is a timeline of the history of the city of Hangzhou, Zhejiang Province, China.

Prior to 10th century

 328 CE - Lingyin monastery founded near Hangzhou.
 606 - City walls built.
 609 - Grand Canal built.
 630 - Mosque built (approximate date).
 822 - Poet Bai Juyi becomes governor.

10th century
 904 - City becomes capital of the Wuyue Kingdom.
 954 - Huiri Yongming Temple built at West Lake.
 963 - Baochu Pagoda built at West Lake.
 970 - Liuhe Pagoda built.
 975 - Leifeng Pagoda built.

12th-17th centuries
 1127 - Song Dynasty capital relocated to Hongzhou from Kaifeng after the Jingkang Incident of the Jin–Song wars.
 1221 - Yue Fei Temple built
 1275 - Population: 1.75 million.
 1277 - Hangzhou Salt Distribution Commission established.
 1276 - Mongols in power.
 1621 - Huanduzhai publishing house in business.
 1661 - Cathedral of the Immaculate Conception built.

19th century
 1861 - Taiping rebels take city.
 1863 - Imperial forces take city.
 1867 - Hangchow Presbyterian Boys' School in operation.
 1870 - Hu Ch'ing Yu T'ang medicine shop in business (approximate date).
 1871 - Kwang-Chi Hospital established.
 1885 - Kwang Chi Medical School established.
 1896 - City opens to foreign trade per Treaty of Shimonoseki.
 1897 - Qiushi Academy founded.
 1899 - Hangzhou High School established.

20th century

 1904 - Xiling Society of the Seal Art founded.
 1907 - Qing Tai Men Station opens.
 1908
 Zhejiang Official Secondary Normal School in operation.
 Presbyterian Mission Girls School opens.
 1911
 October 27: Uprising.
 Zhejiang Medical School founded.
 Population: 141,859.
 1922 - Sisters of Charity Hospital founded.
 1928
 Kuomintang in power.
 Population: 817,267.
 1929
 Zhejiang Provincial Museum established.
 1929 Westlake exposition held.
 1937 - Japanese occupation begins.
 1947 – Constitution of the Republic of China adopted
 1949 - May: Communists take city.
 1955 - Hangzhou Ri Bao (Hangzhou Daily) newspaper begins publication.
 1956 - Hangzhou Xuejun High School and Hangzhou Botanical Garden established.
 1957
 Hangzhou Jianqiao Airport begins operating civilian flights.
 Population: 784,000.
 1958 - Hangzhou Zoo opens.
 1962 - Wang Zida becomes mayor.
 1966 - Hangzhou Gymnasium (arena) opens.
 1972 - February: Richard Nixon visits city.
 1977 - Zhang Zishi becomes mayor.
 1978 - Hangzhou Teachers College founded.
 1979 - Chen Anyu becomes mayor.
 1981 - Zhou Feng becomes mayor.
 1984 - Zhong Boxi becomes mayor.
 1988 - Zhang Taiyan Museum opens.
 1989
 Protests.
 Hangzhou Wahaha Nutritional Foods Factory in business.
 Lu Wenge becomes mayor.
 1990 - Population: 2,589,504.
 1991
 Hangzhou Hi-Tech Industrial Development Zone approved.
 1947 Constitution amended, former Nationalist government in Taiwan downplays claim to Hangzhou
 1992
 Wang Yongming becomes mayor.
 Yue Fei Tomb shopping mall built.
 1993 - Hangzhou Economic & Technological Development Zone approved.
 1998
 Zhejiang University established.
 Hangzhou Xiaoshan Sports Centre (stadium) built.
 Hangzhou Greentown Football Club formed.
 1999 - Hangzhou railway station rebuilt.
 2000
 Hangzhou Xiaoshan Airport begins operating.
 Hangzhou Export Processing Zone approved.
 Dragon Well Manor in business.
 Population: 3,240,947.

21st century

 2002
 Xihuwenhua Square built.
 Wang Guoping becomes CPC Party chief.
 Leifeng Pagoda reconstructed.
 2003 - Yellow Dragon Sports Center and Hangzhou No.2 Telecom Hub constructed.
 2005 - Sun Zhonghuan becomes mayor.
 2007
 Hangzhou Sanchao Football Club formed.
 Cai Qi becomes mayor.
 2008
 Hangzhou Public Bicycle program launched.
 City logo design adopted.
 2010
 Shanghai–Hangzhou Passenger Railway begins operating.
 Huang Kunming becomes CPC Party chief.
 2011 - Shao Zhanwei becomes mayor.
 2012 - November: Hangzhou Metro begins operating.
 2013 - Air pollution in Hangzhou reaches annual mean of 61 PM2.5 and 106 PM10, much higher than recommended.

See also
 Hangzhou history
 List of universities and colleges in Hangzhou
 Major National Historical and Cultural Sites (Zhejiang)
 List of first batch of declared historic buildings in Hangzhou
 List of second batch of declared historic buildings in Hangzhou
 List of third batch of declared historic buildings in Hangzhou
 List of fourth batch of declared historic buildings in Hangzhou
 List of fifth batch of declared historic buildings in Hangzhou
 Urbanization in China

References

This article incorporates information from the Ukrainian Wikipedia.

Bibliography

Published in the 19th century
 
 

Published in the 20th century
 

 
 
 
 
 
 
 
 
 
 

Published in the 21st century

External links

 The Authoritative Website of Hangzhou History and Culture | WWW.HICENTER.CN

Years in China

Hangzhou